Agyneta collina is a species of sheet weaver found in Colombia. It was described by Millidge in 1991.

References

collina
Spiders described in 1991
Spiders of South America
Endemic fauna of Colombia